The 2011 Total 24 Hours of Spa was the 64th running of the 24 Hours of Spa. It was also the third round of the 2011 Blancpain Endurance Series season and was held over 30 and 31 July at the Circuit de Spa-Francorchamps. The race was won by Greg Franchi, Timo Scheider, and Mattias Ekström of Audi Sport Team WRT.

Qualifying
Most of the 62 qualifiers set their fastest times in the third qualifying session due to the fully dry track. In the previous two sessions it was a drying wet track.

Qualifying result
Class leaders are in bold, the fastest lap for each car is in gray.

Race

Race Result
Class winners in bold.  Cars failing to complete 70% of winner's distance marked as Not Classified (NC).

References

External links
 

Spa
Spa 24 Hours
Spa